This is a Timeline of Scientology, particularly its foundation and development by author L. Ron Hubbard as well as general publications, articles, books and other milestones.

1938
 L. Ron Hubbard authors a manuscript called "Excalibur" which contains ideas that were later incorporated into Scientology.

1949
 First published work on Dianetics appeared in the Winter/Spring issue of the Explorers Club Journal entitled "Terra Incognita: The Mind". At this time, he offered his findings on the mind to both the American Medical Association and the American Psychiatric Association. Both organizations rejected them.

1950s

1950
 On May 9, 1950, L. Ron Hubbard's Dianetics — The Modern Science of Mental Health was published.
  In August 1950, amidst the success of Dianetics, Hubbard held a demonstration in Los Angeles' Shrine Auditorium where he presented a young woman called Sonya Bianchi to a large audience including many reporters and photographers as "the world's first Clear." However, despite Hubbard's claim that she had "full and perfect recall of every moment of her life", Bianchi proved unable to answer questions from the audience testing her memory and analytical abilities, including the question of the color of Hubbard's tie. Later, in the late 1950s, Hubbard would claim that several people had reached the state of Clear by the time he presented Bianchi as the world's first; these others, Hubbard said, he had successfully cleared in the late 1940s while working incognito in Hollywood posing as a swami. In 1966, Hubbard declared South African Scientologist John McMaster to be the first true Clear. McMaster left the Sea Org in November 1969, expressing continuing belief in the Scientology Tech, but disapproval of the way Scientology was managed.
 "Dianetics: Evolution of a Science" was published in Astounding Science Fiction, whose editor was John W. Campbell, an early Dianetics enthusiast.
 Hubbard Dianetics Research Foundation established in Elizabeth, New Jersey.

1951
 June:  Science of Survival was published.
 A Doctor's Report on Dianetics published by medical doctor and Dianetics enthusiast Joseph A. Winter.

1952
 Early Dianetics supporter Joseph Winter M.D. breaks with Hubbard, convinced "that it is dangerous for laymen to try to audit each other".
 May 1952 – Hubbard's Dianetics Center moves to Phoenix. Phoenix is considered the "birthplace of Scientology."

1952
 February: After learning that the Hubbard Dianetic Foundation of Wichita, Kansas would be liable for the debts of the defunct Hubbard Dianetic Research Foundation of Elizabeth, New Jersey, the board of directors, led by Don Purcell, voted to file for voluntary bankruptcy over Hubbard's objections. Hubbard forms a rival Hubbard College, also in Wichita, and disputes control of the copyrights of the Dianetics materials.
 May: Hubbard publicly announces the formal establishment of the philosophy of Scientology and the formation of the Hubbard Association of Scientologists International, demonstrates the E-meter, and moves to Phoenix, Arizona.
 July: Scientology: A History of Man published.

1953
 Church of Scientology, Church of American Science and Church of Spiritual Engineering incorporated in Elizabeth, New Jersey by L. Ron Hubbard. Co-signatories were Henrietta Hubbard, L. Ron Hubbard Jr., John Galusha, Verna Greenough and Barbara Bryan. Named as trustees of the Church of Scientology were L. Ron Hubbard, Mary Sue Hubbard (not present), and John Galusha.

1954
 The Church of Scientology is incorporated in California and Arizona.
 The Internal Revenue Service grants a tax exemption to the Church of Scientology of California (CSC).

1955
 April: The Hubbard Association of Scientologists International holds the First Australian Scientology Congress in Prahran, Victoria, Australia.
 July: The Founding Church of Scientology, now known as the Original Founding Church of Scientology was organized in Washington, D.C.

1956
 The church is recognized as a tax-exempt religious organization in the United States.

1959
 Hubbard moved to England and bought Saint Hill Manor in Sussex, from which he would direct international operations and expansion until 1967.

1960s

1963
 January 4: The US Food and Drug Administration raided the Original Founding Church of Scientology and seized approximately 100 of the Church's E-meters as illegal medical devices. The devices are now required to carry a disclaimer saying that they are a purely religious artifact. They are used in a Scientology counseling technique known as "auditing".

1965
 The Church of Scientology was banned in several Australian states, starting with Victoria. The ban was based on the Anderson Report, which found that the auditing process involved "command" hypnosis, in which the hypnotist assumes "positive authoritative control" over the patient."
 Classification, Gradation and Awareness Chart released in East Grinstead, United Kingdom

1966
 Narconon founded.
 August 1966 - OT I released.
 September 1966 - OT II released.
 John McMaster announced as first true clear.

1967
 The IRS strips the Church of Scientology in California, Scientology's headquarters, of its tax-exempt status, asserting that its activities are commercial and operated for the benefit of Mr. Hubbard, rather than charitable or religious reasons.
 OT III is made available to Scientologists.  This level of Operating Thetan contains the story of Xenu, which becomes a source of enormous controversy for Scientology from the 1990s onward.
 The Sea Organization (or Sea Org) officially established.
 December 27: The first Advanced Organization, offering the advanced levels of Scientology to the public, was established aboard the Royal Scotman, the flagship of the Sea Organization. (This ship was later renamed the Apollo.)

1968
 Introduction to Scientology Ethics is published.
 August 1968 – Freedom Magazine Founded by Church of Scientology.

1969
 The U.S. court of appeals recognizes Scientology as a religion, marking the high point of the case of Scientology vs. the FDA.
 Standard Dianetics released.
 Citizens Commission on Human Rights (CCHR) founded in the United States.

1970s

1970
 February 22: Church of Scientology Celebrity Centre in Los Angeles founded.
 Criminon founded.
 November: Hubbard begins delivery of Flag Executive Briefing
 Personal Spiritual Freedoms Foundation – later called Dianology and then Eductivism, established by Jack Horner
 Scientology: The Now Religion published by journalist George Malko

1971
 The FDA is ordered to return the materials and E-meters seized during the 1963 raid.

1974
 January 23, 1974 – Introspection Rundown released.

1975
 Scientologists buy former Fort Harrison Hotel and old Bank of Clearwater.
 Scientology is recognized as a non-profit organization in South Africa, despite the 1972 report of a formal government Commission of Inquiry that recommended otherwise.

1977
 Various locations of the Church of Scientology are raided by the FBI.

1978
 New Era Dianetics released.

1979
 As a result of FBI raids, eleven senior people in the church's Guardian's Office were convicted of obstructing justice, burglary of government offices, and theft of documents and government property. (See Operation Snow White)
 March: Hubbard Mark IV E-meter released.
 December: An estimated 3,000 gather at Clearwater City Hall to protest the church coming to Clearwater. Across the street, Scientologists stage a counter rally, dressed as clowns and wearing animal costumes.
 December: Purification Rundown released.

1980s

1980
 Acquisition of the former White Rats Club building at 227 West 46th in the Broadway Theater District in New York City.  The building was built in 1912 and the church acquired it from the Seventh-day Adventist Church.
 January – New OT IV released.
 August – Golden Era Productions established.
 September – New OT V (Hubbard Solo New Era Dianetics for OTs) and OT VII released.

1981
 February – The Way to Happiness: A Common Sense Guide to Better Living published.
 November 19 – Church of Scientology International (CSI) founded.
 December – Scientology Missions International founded.

1982
 Clearwater's government holds hearings to explore allegations that the church is a cult.
 May – Church of Spiritual Technology Incorporated.
 Battlefield Earth published.

1983
 The High Court of Australia overturns the Scientology ban, declaring that "The applicant has easily discharged the onus of showing that it is religious. The conclusion that it is a religious institution entitled to the tax exemption is irresistible."
 The Church of Scientology of Toronto is raided. (See R. v. Church of Scientology of Toronto)
 December – Office of Special Affairs International formed.

1985
 The Church of Scientology acquires yacht "Bohème" and renames it to "Freewinds".
 October – First of ten volumes of Mission Earth published.

1986
 
 January 24: Hubbard dies at his ranch near San Luis Obispo, California.
 David Miscavige, Chairman of the Board of the Author Services Inc., becomes head.

1990s

1991
 After the completion of a 4-year long program to reissue the books and courses of Dianetics and Scientology, a general amnesty is declared for members.
 September – Streamlined Bridge to Total Freedom released (grade chart).

1992
 June: The Church of Scientology is found guilty on two counts of breach of the public trust in Ontario, Canada in R. v. Church of Scientology of Toronto and fined $250,000. Seven members are also convicted.

1993
 December: The Internal Revenue Service of the United States grants full religious recognition and tax exemption to all Scientology Churches, missions and social betterment groups in that country.

1994
 December 24: a number of Scientology's confidential Operating Thetan documents are published on the newsgroup alt.religion.scientology through an anonymous remailer.  This marks the beginning of Scientology's online activities, often referred to as Scientology versus the Internet.

1995
 July 20: The Supreme Court of Canada upholds the largest libel award in Canadian history against the Church of Scientology. (See Hill v. Church of Scientology of Toronto)
 December 5: Lisa McPherson, a 36-year-old Scientologist dies after 17 days under the care of Church of Scientology Flag Service Organization. Police begin an investigation the following day.

1996
 The Church releases the Golden Age of Tech program with the express goal of improving and speeding up the training of its practitioners.
 On 21 November 1996, Don Jason, a Scientology Chief Officer with prior authority over hundreds of staff in Clearwater, Florida, escaped from the Scientology church by jumping off their 440-foot-long ship named Freewinds that was docked at the time in the Bahamas. As he had escaped the church (Scientology vernacular: "blown") earlier that year in August, he was barred from leaving Freewinds, his passport confiscated. Running from the ship, he jumped into a waiting taxicab, closing the door on a Scientology guard's hand, and screamed to the driver: "I'm being held against my will! Take me to a g-- d---airport!1997
 February: McPherson's family files a wrongful-death lawsuit against the church.
 The Church of Scientology, operating as the Greek Center of Applied Philosophy, is ordered closed in Greece. Decision upheld in 1998.

1998
 November: After reviewing the McPherson case for 11 months, State Attorney Bernie McCabe charges the Church of Scientology with two felonies: practicing medicine without a license and abuse of a disabled adult. Also, the church begins construction of the Flag Building, launching a $160-million construction project in downtown Clearwater, Florida.

1999
 The Charity Commission for England and Wales denies the Church of Scientology's application for charitable status, ruling that it is not a religion and that there is no established "public benefit arising out of the practice of Scientology". The Church does not appeal the decision.
 November: The government of Sweden declares that the Church of Scientology is a charitable, non-profit organization with a religious purpose. A year later, the Church's ministers are granted the right to perform marriages, completing official recognition as a church in Sweden.
 Bob Minton, a banker critical of Scientology, starts a protest organization called the Lisa McPherson Trust. The organization picketed Scientology buildings on the anniversary of McPherson's death. The group was disbanded in November 2001.

2000s
2000
 March: The Italian Supreme Court upholds Scientology's religious status in Italy while reaffirming that Narconon is a non-tax-exempt for-profit business.
 Scientology ministers are granted the right to perform marriages in South Africa.
 In the United Kingdom, the Church of Scientology is exempted from value added tax on the basis that it is a not-for-profit body.
 June: McCabe drops the criminal case against the church, noting that the medical examiner's change of opinion about the cause of McPherson's death undercuts the prosecution's effort to prove the criminal case beyond a reasonable doubt.

2002
 The government of New Zealand issues an official decree fully recognizing the Church of Scientology of New Zealand as an exempt religious and charitable organization.
 The Austrian tax office concludes that the work of the Church of Scientology in Vienna is for the public benefit rather than anyone's personal profit, and grants that church tax-exempt status as a charitable religious organization.
 July: A Paris judge rules that a 13-year-old case against the Church of Scientology alleging fraud and illegal practice of medicine cannot go to trial, due to lack of progress in the investigation. The judge rules that the statute of limitations has expired.

2003
 March: The National Ministry of the Interior for Taiwan recognizes the Church of Scientology of Taiwan as a charitable religious institution, officially adding it to the rolls of the country's recognized religions.

2004
 May: The church and the estate of Lisa McPherson reach a private settlement.

2005
 The U.S. Department of State's 2005 Report on International Religious Freedom announces that the Church of Scientology has been registered as a religious group by the Kyrgyzstan State Commission on Religious Affairs.
 David Miscavige announces the Golden Age of Knowledge, a Church program intended to make all Scientology materials available. It starts with the release of 18 congresses.

2006
 Scientology applies for status as a religious confessional community in Austria, but later withdraws its application.

2007
 In the next major step of the Golden Age of Knowledge program, 18 revised books and 11 lecture series are released.
 April: the European Court of Human Rights rules against Russia for repeatedly refusing to consider the Moscow Church of Scientology's application for the status of a legally valid religious association. The court finds that the reasons given to deny re-registration of the church by the justice department and endorsed by the Moscow courts have no legal basis.
 A Belgian state prosecutor recommends that a case should be brought against 12 physical persons associated with Scientology and two legal entities – the Belgian Church of Scientology and Scientology's Office of Human Rights – on counts of extortion, fraud, organized crime, obstruction of medical practice, illegal medical practice, invasion of privacy, conspiracy and commercial infractions like abusive contractual clauses. The proposal is referred to an administrative court who is to decide at a later date whether charges will be brought.
 October 31: Scientology is formally recognized as a religion in Spain 
 November: Scientology is officially recognized as a religion in Portugal.
 December 3: South Africa grants the Church tax exemption and issues a certificate recognizing it as a "Public Benefit Organisation".
 December 7: German federal and state interior ministers formally express the view that the Scientology organization continues to pursue anti-constitutional goals and ask Germany's domestic intelligence agencies to collect and evaluate the necessary information that would be required for a possible judicial inquiry aimed at banning the organization.Sammlung der zur Veröffentlichung freigegebenen Beschlüsse der 185. Sitzung der Ständigen Konferenz der Innenminister und -senatoren der Länder am 7. Dezember 2007 in Berlin   The move is criticized by politicians from all parts of the political spectrum, with legal experts expressing concern that an attempt to ban the organization would most likely fail in the courts.Innenminister fordern Verbot von Scientology, article in Die Welt, 2007-12-8  This view is echoed by the German intelligence agencies, who warn that a ban would be doomed to fail.
March: Mike Rinder, former senior executive, escapes Scientology.

2008

 January 14: A video created by the Church of Scientology was posted on YouTube featuring Tom Cruise talking about various Scientology topics including "Keeping Scientology Working" or KSW". More details are visible with "Project Chanology".
January 15: "Tom Cruise: An Unauthorized Biography" by Andrew Morton is released.
June 4: Mark Bunker, American politician, broadcast journalist, videographer and documentary filmmaker, conducts and uploads an interview with Actor Jason Beghe who defected the Church in 2007.
 Internet-based group Anonymous launches Project Chanology, a worldwide protest against the Church of Scientology, which drew about 7,000 people in more than 93 cities on February 10, 2008.
 November: Germany drops its attempt to ban Scientology, after finding insufficient evidence of illegal or unconstitutional activity. However, monitoring of Scientology's activities by the German intelligence services continues.

2009

 June 21: The Tampa Bay Times publishes the first article of The Truth Rundown with multiple parts including alleged physical abuse, verbal abuse, imprisonment and torture by the leader David Miscavige and details on the  Lisa McPherson Case.
October 26: Paul Haggis goes public with resigning from the Church of Scientology primarily over the policy of disconnection and Scientologys views on homosexuality based on their policies.  In 1950 Hubbard published Dianetics: The Modern Science of Mental Health, introducing his "science of the mind," Dianetics. He classified homosexuality as an illness or sexual perversion, citing contemporary psychiatric and psychological textbooks to support his view:  "The sexual pervert (and by this term Dianetics, to be brief, includes any and all forms of deviation in Dynamic II [i.e. sexuality] such as homosexuality, lesbianism, sexual sadism, etc., and all down the catalog of Ellis and Krafft-Ebing) is actually quite ill physically...he is very far from culpable for his condition, but he is also far from normal and extremely dangerous to society..."  Hubbard further defined perversion in his 1951 book Science of Survival: Prediction of Human Behavior, where he introduced the concept of the "tone scale", a means of classifying individuals and human behavior on a chart running from +40 (the most beneficial) to −40 (the least beneficial). A good summary can also be found on religious tolerance.org.
 October 27: Scientologists convicted of fraud in France.
November 5: "Blown for good: Behind the Iron Curtain of Scientology" by Marc Headley is released.

2010s
2010
 Scientology churches open in Brussels, Quebec, Las Vegas, Johannesburg, Los Angeles, Mexico City, Pasadena and Washington State.

2011
Lawrence Wright's story on the New Yorker reporting on the Church of Scientology is published.

 2012 

 March 25: After 42 years Ronald T. Miscavige, Father of the leader David Miscavige, escapes from the Gold base.
September: Tony Ortega, Blogger, Journalist & Author, launches freelance blog entitled "The Underground Bunker" that is focused solely on Scientology, after reporting on the Church since 1995.

2013

 January 17: "Going Clear: Scientology, Hollywood and the Prison of Belief" by Lawrence Wright is released.
Scientology Ideal Org in Kaohsiung, Taiwan opens.
Flag Building unveiled in Clearwater, Florida after 15 years of construction.
Scientology released its largest training program – The Golden Age of Tech Phase II.
UK recognizes Scientology as a religion and allows Scientology wedding.
Leah Remini goes public with leaving the Church of Scientology.

 2014 

 November 13: Upload Video "Scientologists celebrity centre gala 2005" on YouTube. In the video Giovanni Ribisi states (at 2:08) that Scientology is a "pragmatic religion" and members can have any religious denomination. This statement contradicts the required criteria that Scientology confirmed to the IRS US, that Scientology was in fact its own religion and solely based on the works of L. Ron Hubbard.

2015
The Going Clear Documentary by Alex Gibney is released.
May: Tony Ortega releases his book about Scientology critic Paulette Cooper entitled The Unbreakable Miss Lovely.'' Paulette Cooper is an american author and journalist who started writing about Scientology in 1968 with an article called "The Scandal of Scientology" for "Queen" a british magazine. Despite receiving death threats, she decided to publish further details in a book after the article was published. The book also bears the name "The Scandal of Scientology". Paulette Cooper uploaded the book on her homepage as a free read.
"My Scientology Movie" Documentary by Louis Theroux is released in London.
"Troublemaker: Surviving Hollywood and Scientology" by Leah Remini is released.

2016 

 May 3: "Ruthless: Scientology, My Son David Miscavige, and Me" by Ronald T. Miscavige is released.
August 8: Joe Rogan Experience #835 uploads podcast episode with Louis Theroux in which his documentary on Scientology is explained.
November 29: "Leah Remini: Scientology and the Aftermath" a documentary series about the Church of Scientology explained through personal experiences of various defectors, journalist and others, is released via A&E. A statement regarding the docuseries by the Church of Scientology was published on their Website, scientologynews.org, on November 26, 2016.

2017 

 January 31: On an episode of the Joe Rogan Experience (episode #908) guest star Leah Remini explains her experience with OT III, a level on The Bridge to Total Freedom. The Bridge to Total Freedom is a chart or process used by the Church of Scientology to describe members advancement).
 February 2: Documentary and upload by Real Stories "Scientology: Mysterious Deaths (Religious Documentary) | Real Stories".
February 4: In an interview Giovanni Ribisi describes Scientology as an "applied religious philosophy".

2018
March 12: The Scientology Network is launched and made available on Apple TV, Amazon's Fire TV, Roku and Google Chromecast.

2019 

 February 11: "Where is the missing wife of Scientology's ruthless leader?" documentary by 60 Minutes Australia is released
April 3: A convicted murderer named Kenneth Wayne Thompson blames upbringing as a Scientologist as reason for murders.

2020s

2020
April: The Church of Scientology announced an online prevention center in response to the COVID-19 pandemic.

2021 

 August 17: Laura Prepon has not practiced Scientology since 2016.

2022 

 October 11: Danny Masterson's criminal trial for the alleged sexual assault against three women started. Before and during the trial many possible aspects of the involvement of the Church of Scientology were discussed in and out of court.

References

External links
 Scientology.org: Important Dates in Scientology
 L Ron Hubbard biographical Timeline, including important Scientology dates

Scientology
Scientology